Isocentris charopalis is a moth in the family Crambidae. It was described by Charles Swinhoe in 1907. It is found in the Democratic Republic of the Congo, South Africa, Zimbabwe and the Australian state of Queensland.

References

Moths described in 1907
Pyraustinae